Lights of Euphoria is a music group from Germany. The group was originally intended as a single-song project, but remained together after the success of their first song, "Subjection".

Their single, "True Life", peaked at #3 on the German Alternative Charts (DAC), ranking #27 on the DAC Top Singles for 2003. Their EP, Sleepwalk (The Awakening), peaked at #7 on the DAC Singles chart in 2005.

Discography

 Violent World (MCD)
 Brainstorm (CD)
 Thoughtmachine (CD)
 Beyond Subconsciousness (CD)
 Fahrenheit (CD)
 Blood Brothers (CD, US version of Fahrenheit)
 Voices (CD)
 Fortuneteller (MCD)
 True Life (MCD)
 Krieg Gegen die Maschinen (CD)
 Fading Moments (EP)
 One Nation (MCD)
 Querschnitt (CD, best of compilation)
 Gegen Den Strom (CD)
 Sleepwalk (The Awakening) (MCD)

External links

MySpace Page
 Label biography

References

German electronic music groups
Musical groups established in 1992
German industrial music groups
Metropolis Records artists
Zoth Ommog Records artists